Servicios de Transportes Aéreos Fueguinos S.A. (also known as STAF Airlines) was an Argentinean cargo airline based in Buenos Aires, operating scheduled and chartered flights to destinations throughout the Americas using leased aircraft. The airline went out of business in 2005.

Fleet

SATF operated the following aircraft:

See also
List of defunct airlines of Argentina

References

External links

Defunct airlines of Argentina
Airlines established in 1985
Airlines disestablished in 2005
Argentine companies established in 1985